The ARIA Music Award for Best Dance Release, is an award presented at the annual ARIA Music Awards, which recognises "the many achievements of Aussie artists across all music genres", since 1987. It is handed out by the Australian Recording Industry Association (ARIA), an organisation whose aim is "to advance the interests of the Australian record industry." 
To be eligible, the recording (an album or single) must have been commercially released. The award is presented to an artist within the dance genre. The accolade is voted for by a judging school, which comprises between 40 and 100 members of representatives experienced in this genre, and is given to a solo artist, group, production team or various artist compilation, who is either from Australia or an Australian resident.

The award for Best Dance Release was first presented to Itch-E and Scratch-E in 1995 for their single, "Sweetness and Light". In the following year Future Sound of Melbourne won the award for their album Chapter One. Pnau has won the award the most times, with three wins. They are also tied with Rüfüs Du Sol for most nominations, with six nominations each.

Winners and nominees
In the following table, the winner is highlighted in a separate colour, and in boldface; the nominees are those that are not highlighted or in boldface.

References

External links
The ARIA Awards Official website

D
A